Kiril Lazarov (born 10 May 1980) is a retired Macedonian handball player and current coach of the North Macedonia national handball team and RK Alkaloid.

Lazarov holds the record for most goals scored in a single World Men's Handball Championship (92). He is also the all-time top scorer in the EHF Champions League and the only player to have scored more than 1,300 goals. He is regarded as one of the greatest handball players of all time.

Biography
Lazarov was the top scorer of the EHF Champions League two times with MVM Veszprém and RK Zagreb. In 2011–12, he was the top scorer for Velux EHF Final 4 runner-up Atlético Madrid.

On 29 January 2009, Lazarov became world record-holder for the number of goals scored in one World Championship. In nine games he scored 92 goals for the Macedonia national team at the 2009 World Men's Handball Championship that took place in Croatia. On 24 March 2009, Kiril Lazarov was awarded the Medal for Service to the Country by the then-president of the Republic of Macedonia Branko Crvenkovski in acknowledgment of his sport achievements and his contribution to developing and popularizing the sport in Macedonia as well as promoting the country abroad.

On 27 January 2012, Lazarov became both the European and World record-holder for scored goals in a single championship by scoring 61 goals in 7 games at the 2012 European Men's Handball Championship.

On 4 October 2015, with his fifth goal in a match against PICK Szeged, Lazarov became the first player in the history of the EHF Champions League to break the 1000 goals barrier and helped Barcelona win 30:28.

On 29 May 2016, Lazarov was voted as The Best Right Back of the Champions League All-star team.

In late December 2020, he was voted as best right back of the decade in a poll organized by Handball Planet, with votes coming from fans and jury consisted of handball legends, coaches and journalists.

Results

Lazarov has won 15 national championships and the same number of national cup tournaments for five different clubs. In international club tournaments, his best results are two runners-up.

RK Pelister
Macedonian League: (1997–98 and 1999-00)
Macedonian Cup: (1998 and 1999)
RK Zagreb
Croatian League: ( 2001, 2002, 2008, 2009 and 2010)
Croatian Cup: (2000, 2008, 2009 and 2010)
MKB Veszprem KC
Hungarian League: ( 2003, 2004, 2005 and 2006)
Hungarian Cup: ( 2003, 2004, 2005 and 2007)
BM Ciudad Real
Copa del Rey: (2010–11)
ASOBAL Cup: (2010–11)
ASOBAL Supercup: (2010–11)
EHF Champions League runner-up: (2010–11)
IHF Super Globe: (2011)
BM Atlético Madrid
ASOBAL Supercup: (2011–12)
Copa del Rey: (2011–12) and (2012–13)
ASOBAL Cup: (2012–2013)
IHF Super Globe: (2012)
FC Barcelona Handbol
EHF Champions League: (2014–15)
ASOBAL League: (2013–14), (2014–15) and (2015–16)
IHF Super Globe: (2013), (2014)
ASOBAL Supercup: (2013–14), (2014–15) and (2015–16)
Copa del Rey: (2013–14), (2014–15) and (2015–16)
ASOBAL Cup: (2013–14), (2014–15) and (2015–16)
HBC Nantes
EHF Champions League runner-up: (2017–18)

Personal life
Lazarov has been married to his wife Ljubica since June 2006. They have two children, a boy named Blagojče and girl named Lana. His brother Filip is also a handball player.

See also
List of handballers with 1000 or more international goals

References

External links

FC Barcelona profile

1980 births
Living people
Macedonian male handball players
Liga ASOBAL players
BM Ciudad Real players
RK Zagreb players
Veszprém KC players
FC Barcelona Handbol players
People from Sveti Nikole
Macedonian expatriate sportspeople in Croatia
Macedonian expatriate sportspeople in France
Macedonian expatriate sportspeople in Hungary
Macedonian expatriate sportspeople in Qatar
Macedonian expatriate sportspeople in Spain
Expatriate handball players
Handball coaches of international teams
Macedonian handball coaches